Skalička is a municipality and village in Přerov District in the Olomouc Region of the Czech Republic. It has about 700 inhabitants.

History
The first written mention of Skalička is from 1328.

References

Villages in Přerov District